Keith Edward Acton (born April 15, 1958) is a Canadian former professional ice hockey centre who played 15 seasons in the National Hockey League (NHL), with the Montreal Canadiens, Minnesota North Stars, Edmonton Oilers, Philadelphia Flyers, Washington Capitals and New York Islanders between 1980 and 1994. In his NHL coaching career he has been an assistant coach with the Columbus Blue Jackets, the Philadelphia Flyers, the New York Rangers, the Toronto Maple Leafs and most recently the Edmonton Oilers, who released Acton and fellow assistant Craig Ramsay on June 4, 2015.

Acton ran for mayor of Whitchurch-Stouffville in the 2018 elections.

Playing career
Acton was selected 103rd overall by the Montreal Canadiens in the 1978 NHL Amateur Draft. He began his NHL career on Montreal's fourth line but his productive play soon earned him a promotion to the first line, where he centered all-stars Steve Shutt and Guy Lafleur. He became known as one of the best faceoff men in the NHL. His most productive NHL season came in 1981–82 when he registered 88 points in 78 games with Montreal. When his production dipped the following year to just fifty points, his stock in Montreal fell and early in the 1983-84 campaign, Acton was part of a blockbuster trade.  The Canadiens packaged Acton up with Mark Napier and a third pick and dealt them to the Minnesota North Stars for Bobby Smith.

With Minnesota, Acton reeled off three consecutive 20-goal seasons but after a slow start to the 1987-88 season he was dealt to the Edmonton Oilers.

With Edmonton and their high-powered offence, Acton was not expected to help carry the offence and settled into a more defensive role.  That spring he won the Stanley Cup though he played just seven games in the post season. Acton was a healthy scratch through the first two rounds and remained in the pressbox through the first three games of the conference final against the Detroit Red Wings.  However, with the Oilers' coaching staff looking for more speed on their fourth line, Acton was inserted into the lineup for game four and he paid immediate dividends, scoring the series-clinching goal.  His clutch play continued in the Stanley Cup final when he ended game one against the Boston Bruins by tipping a Steve Smith point shot for the game winning goal. Despite his playoff heroics, it still proved difficult to carve out a place on the Oilers' deep roster and late in the 1988-89 season, his second in Edmonton, he was on the move again when he was traded to Philadelphia in exchange for tough guy Dave Brown.

Acton spent the next four seasons with the Flyers.  During 1993-94 season he signed with Washington Capitals but was put on waivers after just six games, and was claimed by the New York Islanders, with whom he finished the season before retiring.

Personal life
Acton's son, Will, is also a hockey player.  Like his father, Will played parts of two seasons with the Edmonton Oilers. Will now plays for the Schwenninger Wild Wings of the DEL.

In 2018, Acton became a candidate for mayor of Whitchurch-Stouffville, Ontario, in the Ontario municipal elections in which he came in second.

Awards and achievements
1979-80 AHL Second Team All-Star
1987–88 - NHL - Stanley Cup (Edmonton)

Career statistics

Regular season and playoffs

International

Coaching statistics
Season  Team                Lge Type 
1994-95 Philadelphia Flyers NHL Assistant               
1995-96 Philadelphia Flyers NHL Assistant               
1996-97 Philadelphia Flyers NHL Assistant               
1997-98 Philadelphia Flyers NHL Associate               
1998-99 New York Rangers    NHL Assistant               
1999-00 New York Rangers    NHL Assistant               
2001-02 Toronto Maple Leafs NHL Assistant               
2002-03 Toronto Maple Leafs NHL Assistant               
2003-04 Toronto Maple Leafs NHL Assistant               
2005-06 Toronto Maple Leafs NHL Assistant               
2006-07 Toronto Maple Leafs NHL Assistant               
2007-08 Toronto Maple Leafs NHL Assistant 
2008-09 Toronto Maple Leafs NHL Assistant 
2009-10 Toronto Maple Leafs NHL Assistant 
2010-11 Toronto Maple Leafs NHL Assistant
2013-14 Edmonton Oilers     NHL Assistant

See also
List of NHL players with 1000 games played

References

External links
 
Profile at hockeydraftcentral.com

1958 births
Living people
Canadian ice hockey centres
Canadian ice hockey coaches
Canadian people of English descent
Columbus Blue Jackets coaches
Edmonton Oilers coaches
Edmonton Oilers players
Hershey Bears players
Ice hockey people from Ontario
Minnesota North Stars players
Montreal Canadiens draft picks
Montreal Canadiens players
New York Islanders players
New York Rangers coaches
Nova Scotia Voyageurs players
People from Whitchurch-Stouffville
Peterborough Petes (ice hockey) players
Philadelphia Flyers coaches
Philadelphia Flyers players
Stanley Cup champions
Toronto Maple Leafs coaches
Washington Capitals players
Canadian sportsperson-politicians